Charles Tyrrell may refer to:
 Charles Tyrell (politician) (1776–1872), British Tory politician
 Charles Tyrrell (priest), Dean of Nelson, 1993–2009
 Charles Alfred Tyrrell (1819–1918), promoter of medical devices
 Charles Tyrrell (artist) (born 1950), painter and printmaker